A total of 38 manga titles, one light novel title, and one fan book title made their first appearances in 2010. Black Butler, Hetalia: Axis Powers, and Rosario + Vampire: Season II were the only three titles to reach the top rank on the week of their series debut. In this first full year of the Best Seller list, 15 titles reached the top of the weekly list (in order of number of weeks at the top of the list, from highest to lowest): Naruto, 19 weeks; Bleach, 4 weeks; Negima!, 4 weeks; Rosario + Vampire: Season II, 4 weeks; Vampire Knight, 4 weeks; Black Bird, 2 weeks; Black Butler, 2 weeks; Fullmetal Alchemist, 2 weeks; Hetalia: Axis Powers, 2 weeks; Maximum Ride, 2 weeks; Warriors: Ravenpaw's Path, 2 weeks; Yu-Gi-Oh! GX, 2 weeks; Alice in the Country of Hearts, 1 week; Tsubasa: Reservoir Chronicle, 1 week; and Ouran High School Host Club, 1 week.

Black Butler was the first release published by Yen Press to reach the top rank. Gustines observed that the week 45 releases of Bakuman, D.Gray-man, and Otomen demonstrated the diversity of the Viz Media's publishing line. Bakuman features a slice of life story, D.Gray-man contains demon-slaying, while Otomen is a romance series. Viz Media also introduced an aggressive release schedule for One Piece in 2010, releasing five volumes per month between January and June to bring the volume count of the English release from 24 to 53. On two separate occasions, five One Piece volumes (39–43 in week 15 and 44–48 in week 19) debuted on the Best Seller list simultaneously. Week 19 was also the first time a Naruto release did not appear in the top ten rankings.

Weeks are numbered according to the convention used in the United States, which labels the week containing January 1 as the first week of the year.

Fan book release

Light novel release

References

2010
Manga industry
2010 in comics
The New York Times Manga Best Sellers of 2010